Crying Forest is a Burmese adventure horror television series. It aired on Canal+ Zat Lenn, from November 3, 2022 to January 5, 2023, on every Thursday at 20:00 for 10 episodes.

Synopsis
6 friends who haven't seen each other for years plan a trip to the jungle in order to reconnect. When the forest they went to, called the Dream Weeping Forest, was not as ordinary as they thought. The mysterious events that they will experience will be so haunting.

Cast
Aung Min Khant as Phone Myat
Naw Phaw Eh Htar as Phoo Phoo
Shinn Myat as Thet Paing
Shein Tin Htoo as Kar Yan Shein
Yadanar Bo as Yati
Htut Myat Shwe Yi as Jue Jue

References

Burmese television series